Benjamin Franklin Welty (August 9, 1870 – October 23, 1962) was an American soldier, attorney, and a U.S. Representative from Ohio from 1917 to 1921.

Early life and military service
Born near Bluffton, Ohio, and Pandora, Ohio, Welty's parents emigrated from Switzerland to Ohio in the mid-1800s. He attended the common schools and the Tri-State Normal College of Indiana. He graduated from the Ohio Northern University at Ada in 1894 and from the University of Michigan at Ann Arbor in 1896. He studied law, and was admitted to the bar in 1896 and commenced practice in Lima, Ohio. He served as city solicitor of Bluffton 1897–1909.
He also served as a private during the Spanish–American War.

Legal and political career
He became prosecuting attorney of Allen County 1905–1910, and was a lieutenant colonel in the Ohio National Guard 1908–1913.  He served as special counsel to the Ohio Attorney General 1911–1913, and was a special assistant in the United States Department of Justice 1913–1915.

Welty was elected as a Democrat to the Sixty-fifth and Sixty-sixth Congresses (March 4, 1917 – March 3, 1921).
He was an unsuccessful candidate for reelection in 1920 to the Sixty-seventh Congress.

After his Congressional career, he was employed with Inland Waterways Association 1921–1924.  He resumed the practice of law until 1951, when he retired.  He died in Dayton, Ohio, October 23, 1962.  He was interred in Woodlawn Cemetery, Shawnee Township, Ohio.

References
 Retrieved on 2009-03-04

External links
 
 

1870 births
1962 deaths
American people of Swiss descent
People from Bluffton, Ohio
Ohio lawyers
Trine University alumni
Ohio Northern University alumni
University of Michigan alumni
American military personnel of the Spanish–American War
County district attorneys in Ohio
United States Army soldiers
Democratic Party members of the United States House of Representatives from Ohio